The  (White Mountain) is a breed of domestic sheep native to Germany.  The breed was developed by breeding local sheep with Bergamasca and Tyrol Mountain breeds.

Characteristics 
It is a dual-purpose (meat, wool) breed, with coarse to medium wool and is polled (hornless).

References 

Sheep breeds
Sheep breeds originating in Germany